Springfield Farm may refer to:

Springfield Farm (Williamsport, Maryland), listed on the National Register of Historic Places in Maryland 
Springfield Farm (Ellensburg, Washington), listed on the National Register of Historic Places in Kittitas County, Washington